Louis Blundell (born 16 March 1978 in Chorley, Lancashire) is a former English professional darts player who competed in the Professional Darts Corporation events.

Career
Blundell joined the PDC Pro Tour in 2008. His first appearance in a PDC major event came as a qualifier in the 2009 UK Open, where he reached the last 64 before losing to Andy Roberts. He then played in the last edition of the Las Vegas Desert Classic in 2009, again as a qualifier, losing in the first round to Mervyn King.

Blundell, as well as playing darts, runs a pub.

References

External links
Louis Blundell Official Website

1978 births
English darts players
Living people
Professional Darts Corporation former tour card holders